Barry D. Moore (born 21 August 1944 in Maniwaki, Quebec) is a Canadian industrial commissioner, administrator and politician. Moore was a member of the House of Commons of Canada from 1984 to 1993.

He was elected in the 1984 federal election at the Pontiac—Gatineau—Labelle electoral district for the Progressive Conservative party. He served in the 33rd Canadian Parliament and was re-elected in the 1988 federal election to the 34th Canadian Parliament. In the 1993 federal election, he was defeated by Robert Bertrand of the Liberal Party.

Electoral record

References 

1944 births
Living people
Members of the House of Commons of Canada from Quebec
People from Maniwaki
Progressive Conservative Party of Canada MPs
Anglophone Quebec people